FC Murom is a Russian football team based in Murom. It was founded in 2014 and entered amateur competitions. For 2017–18 season, it received the license for the third-tier Russian Professional Football League after winning their zone of the Russian Amateur Football League.

Current squad
As of 21 February 2023, according to the Second League website.

References

External links
  Official site

Association football clubs established in 2014
Football clubs in Russia
Sport in Vladimir Oblast
2014 establishments in Russia